Roger Caesar Marius Bernard de Delgado Torres Castillo Roberto (1 March 1918 – 18 June 1973) was a British actor. He played many roles on television, radio and in films, and had "a long history of playing minor villains" before becoming best known as the first actor to play the Master in Doctor Who (1971–73).

Early life 
Delgado was born in Whitechapel, in the East End of London; he often remarked to Doctor Who co-star and close friend Jon Pertwee that this made him a true Cockney, as he was born within the sound of Bow bells, even though his mother was Belgian and his father was Spanish. He did not live in the East End, but was brought up in Bedford Park in west London. He attended Cardinal Vaughan Memorial School, a Roman Catholic secondary school in Holland Park, and the London School of Economics for a brief period but did not complete his degree. He served in the Second World War with both the Leicestershire Regiment and the Royal Corps of Signals, attaining the rank of major.

Career 
Delgado worked extensively on the British stage, and on television, film and radio. His theatre debut was in 1939 and his first television appearance was 1948. He appeared in the BBC Television serial Quatermass II (1955), the Powell and Pressburger wartime drama Battle of the River Plate (1956), and came to wide popular attention in Britain when he played the duplicitous Spanish envoy Mendoza in the ITC Entertainment series, Sir Francis Drake, from 1961 to 1962, after which he was in much demand. An in-joke in the 1971 Doctor Who story Colony in Space refers to that role, when the Brigadier tells the Doctor not to worry as the suspected sighting of the Master "was only the Spanish Ambassador". Delgado was frequently cast as a villain, appearing in many British action-adventure TV series by ITC, including Danger Man (1961), The Saint (1962 and 1966), The Champions (1969), and Randall and Hopkirk (Deceased) (1969).

Delgado made a total of 16 guest appearances in ITC shows, the most of any actor, with his last completed role being ITC's The Zoo Gang (1974). He also appeared in The Avengers (1961 and 1969), The Power Game (1966), and an ITV Play of the Week (The Crossfire, 1967). His films included The Terror of the Tongs, The Road to Hong Kong, The Mummy's Shroud and Antony and Cleopatra. He began work as The Master on Doctor Who in late 1970, his first broadcast appearance being in the January 1971 adventure Terror of the Autons. He subsequently reprised the role of the Master in the Third Doctor serials The Mind of Evil, The Claws of Axos, Colony in Space, The Dæmons, The Sea Devils, The Time Monster and Frontier in Space. The Master's story arc was to have ended in The Final Game, which was planned as the final story to feature Pertwee's Third Doctor, but the story was scrapped following Delgado's sudden death and replaced with Planet of the Spiders.

Personal life 
His first marriage was to Olga Anthonisz. The marriage ended in divorce. Delgado married Kismet Shahani in 1957 and they were together until his death in 1973. Shahani died in 2017.

Death 
Delgado died on location in Nevşehir, Turkey, whilst shooting La Cloche tibétaine (Tibetan Bell), a Franco/German television mini-series about the Yellow Expedition. During this expedition, Citroën motor cars traversed Asia in 1931–32 from Peking and Beirut. Delgado appeared in one episode of this production. He was killed, along with two Turkish film technicians, when the car in which he was travelling went off the road into a ravine. He was 55 years old.

Until 2017, there was mystery surrounding the fate of Delgado's remains. It appears that his ashes were scattered on 27 June 1973, in area RB3 (Plot 43) of the Garden of Remembrance at Mortlake Cemetery in Southwest London. He was cremated at Mortlake.

The serial he was filming in Turkey continued production and was completed after his death. The series was broadcast on French and German television in 1974–1975; Delgado can be seen in episode 4 as the minor character Paco.

Jon Pertwee often remarked that Delgado's death was one of the reasons he decided to leave Doctor Who the following year.

Filmography

Film

Television

References

External links 
 

1918 births
1973 deaths
20th-century British male actors
Alumni of the London School of Economics
British Army personnel of World War II
British male film actors
British male television actors
British people of Belgian descent
British people of Spanish descent
People from Whitechapel
Road incident deaths in Turkey
Royal Corps of Signals officers
Royal Leicestershire Regiment officers